Claudia Colla (died 1611), was an alleged Italian witch and the ducal mistress of the sovereign Ranuccio I Farnese, Duke of Parma. 

Colla belonged to the Parmesan merchant class.  In 1599, her ducal lover Farnese married Margherita Aldobrandini. After a decade of childless marriage, Farnese accused Claudia Colla and her mother Elena for having caused the lack of offspring by the use of sorcery.  The accusation of sorcery was unusual for someone of her class.  She was judged guilty and sentenced to be executed by burning.

References

 Ce.unipr.it
 Dallasta, Federica, Luca Ceriotti,  Il Posto Di Caifa

People executed for witchcraft
Executed Italian people
Mistresses of Italian royalty
1611 deaths
16th-century births
17th-century Italian women
People executed by Italian states
People from Parma
Witch trials in Italy
People executed by burning